The Communauté d'agglomération Saumur Val de Loire is an intercommunal structure in the Loire Valley gathering 45 communes including Saumur. It is located in the Maine-et-Loire département, in the Pays de la Loire région, western France. It was formed on 1 January 2017 by the merger of the former Communauté d'agglomération de Saumur Loire Développement, the Communauté de communes Loire Longué, the Communauté de communes du Gennois and the Communauté de communes de la région de Doué-la-Fontaine. Its area is 1233.7 km2. Its population was 99,236 in 2018, of which 26,599 in Saumur proper.

Composition
The Communauté d'agglomération de Saumur Val de Loire gathers 45 communes:

Saumur
Allonnes
Antoigné
Artannes-sur-Thouet
Bellevigne-les-Châteaux
Blou
Brain-sur-Allonnes
La Breille-les-Pins
Brossay
Cizay-la-Madeleine
Le Coudray-Macouard
Courchamps
Courléon
Dénezé-sous-Doué
Distré
Doué-en-Anjou
Épieds
Fontevraud-l'Abbaye
Gennes-Val-de-Loire
La Lande-Chasles
Longué-Jumelles
Louresse-Rochemenier
Montreuil-Bellay
Montsoreau
Mouliherne
Neuillé
Parnay
Le Puy-Notre-Dame
Rou-Marson
Saint-Clément-des-Levées
Saint-Just-sur-Dive
Saint-Macaire-du-Bois
Saint-Philbert-du-Peuple
Souzay-Champigny
Tuffalun
Turquant
Les Ulmes
Varennes-sur-Loire
Varrains
Vaudelnay
Vernantes
Vernoil-le-Fourrier
Verrie
Villebernier
Vivy

References

External links

Saumur
Saumur
States and territories established in 2017